The Peder Skram-class frigate was a class of frigates built for the Royal Danish Navy in the period 1964–1967. The ships were named after Danish admirals Peder Skram and Herluf Trolle

The ships were modernised in 1976–1978 and fitted with guided missiles. Herluf Trolle suffered a serious engine room fire in 1982 and was repaired by 1983. Both ships were placed in reserve in 1987 decommissioned in 1990. Peder Skram is preserved and open to the public at the naval station in Copenhagen. Herluf Trolle was scrapped in Belgium in 1995.

References
  Also published as 
 
 - page from Danish Naval History

Frigate classes